Paoni 14 - Coptic Calendar - Paoni 16

The fifteenth day of the Coptic month of Paoni, the tenth month of the Coptic year. In common years, this day corresponds to June 9, of the Julian Calendar, and June 22, of the Gregorian Calendar.

Commemorations 

 The consecration of the Church of Saint Mina the Martyr, in Mariout
 The return of the relics of Saint Mark the Evangelist

References 

Days of the Coptic calendar